Charleen is a 1977 observational documentary film directed and shot by Ross McElwee, about his friend and former poetry teacher, Charleen Swansea.

Summary
McElwee follows Charleen over a month in her life in North Carolina, where she still teaches poetry and engages in interracial flirtation (to the titillation of her students), and documents her friendship with American poet Ezra Pound.

Production
McElwee shot the film as part of his graduate thesis at MIT.

References

External links

Homepage
Official trailer

References

American documentary films
Films shot in North Carolina
Films set in North Carolina
Films directed by Ross McElwee
Documentary films about poets
American student films
1977 documentary films
Ezra Pound
1970s English-language films
1970s American films